Confederation of Independent Trade Unions may refer to:

 European Confederation of Independent Trade Unions, a regional trade union federation in Europe
 Confederation of Independent Trade Unions of Bosnia and Herzegovina, a national trade union federation in Bosnia and Herzegovina
 Confederation of Independent Trade Unions of Bulgaria, a national trade union federation in Bulgaria
 Confederation of Independent Trade Unions of Luxembourg, a national trade union federation in Luxembourg